The FCC, or  Federal Communications Commission, is an independent agency of the United States government.

FCC may also refer to:

Christianity
 Federated Colored Catholics
 Free Church of Scotland (disambiguation)
 Franciscan Clarist Congregation

Education
 Faujdarhat Cadet College, in Bangladesh
 Federal City College, now merged into the University of the District of Columbia
 Felpham Community College, in England
 Florida Christian College, now Johnson University Florida, in Kissimmee, Florida, United States
 Forman Christian College, in Lahore, Pakistan
 Frederick Community College, in Maryland, United States
 Fresno City College, in Fresno, California, United States
 Footscray City College, a high school in Melbourne, Australia
 freeCodeCamp, a non-profit online course which teaches computer programming

Science and technology
 Face-centered cubic, a crystal system
 Female cosmetic coalitions, a theory about the emergence of art, ritual and symbolic culture 
 Fibrocystic change
 Flash column chromatography
 Fluid catalytic cracking
 Food Chemicals Codex
 Future Circular Collider, a proposed particle collider
 A hypothetical 3-in-one vaccine, for the flu, common cold, and COVID-19.

Sport
 Chilean Cycling Federation
 Colombian Cycling Federation
 Cuban Cycling Federation
 FC Carl Zeiss Jena, a German association football club
 FC Chartres, a French association football club
 FC Cincinnati, an American soccer club who currently play in MLS
 FC Cincinnati (2016–18), predecessor to the above, which played in the league now known as the USL Championship
 FIFA Confederations Cup, international association football tournament for men's national teams organised by FIFA
 Four Continents Championships, a figure skating competition

Transport
 Ferrocarril Central, a former peruvian railway company
 Ferrocarrils de la Generalitat de Catalunya, Railway operator in Catalonia, Spain
 Ferrocarriles de Cuba, the National Railways of Cuba
 First Capital Connect, a defunct United Kingdom train operator

Other uses
 Fairfield Community Connection, an American bulletin board system
 Falling Creek Camp, in North Carolina, United States
 Farm Credit Canada, formerly the Farm Credit Corporation, a Canadian crown corporation
 Flying Cunts of Chaos, an American rock band and former backing band of Serj Tankian
 FCC Environment, a British waste management firm
 "FCC Song", by Eric Idle
 Federal Correctional Complex; see List of U.S. federal prisons
 Five Country Conference, a conference of the immigration authorities for English speaking countries
 Fomento de Construcciones y Contratas, a Spanish construction firm
 Foreign Correspondents' Club, a group of clubs for correspondents and journalists
 Foreign Correspondents' Club, Hong Kong
 Civil Forum for Change (FCC in French), an alliance of civil society groups created in Algeria in 2019
 The Future Cities Catapult, which in April 2019 became the Connected Places Catapult